Kiss of the Spider Woman is a musical with music by John Kander and Fred Ebb, with the book by Terrence McNally.  It is based on the Manuel Puig novel El Beso de la Mujer Araña. Directed by Harold Prince, the musical had runs in the West End (1992) and Broadway (1993) and won the 1993 Tony Award for Best Musical.

Despite a decidedly mixed review by Frank Rich, the musical ran on Broadway for 904 performances.

Plot
Luis Alberto Molina, a gay window dresser, is in a prison in Argentina, serving his third year of an eight-year-sentence for corrupting a minor. He lives in a fantasy world to flee the prison life, the torture, fear and humiliation. His fantasies turn mostly around movies, particularly around a vampy diva, Aurora. He loves her in all roles, but one scares him:  This role is the spider woman, who kills with her kiss.

One day, a new man is brought into his cell: Valentin Arregui Paz, a Marxist revolutionary, already in a bad state of health after torture. Molina cares for him and tells him of Aurora. But Valentin can't stand Molina and his theatrical fantasies and draws a line on the floor to stop Molina from coming nearer to him. Molina, however, continues talking, mostly to block out the cries of the tortured prisoners, about Aurora and his mother. Valentin at last tells Molina that he is in love with a girl named Marta.

Again, Valentin is tortured, again Molina has to care for him afterwards. In his fantasies, Aurora is next to him, helping him do so.

The prison director announces to Molina that his mother is very ill and that Molina will be allowed to see her on one condition: he must tell them the name of Valentin's girlfriend.

Molina tells Valentin about a man he loves, a waiter named Gabriel, who does not return his feelings, and the two men cautiously begin to bond. Only a short while afterwards, Molina gets hallucinations and cramps after knowingly eating poisoned food intended for Valentin. He is brought to the hospital ward, talking to his mother and to the Spider Woman. As Molina is brought back, Valentin starts suffering from the same symptoms, also from poisoned food. Molina is afraid that Valentin will be given substances that might make him talk and so protects Valentin from being taken to the hospital.  As Molina nurses him, Valentin asks him to tell him about his movies. Molina is happy to do so; Valentin also shares his fantasies and hopes with Molina.

Molina is allowed a short telephone conversation with his mother, and he announces to Valentin that he's going to be freed for his good behaviour the next day. Valentin begs him to make a few telephone calls for him. Molina at first refuses, but Valentin persuades him with sex. Molina is brought back the next day, heavily injured. He has been caught in the telephone call, but refuses to tell whom he has phoned. The warden draws his pistol, threatening to shoot him, if he doesn't tell. Molina confesses his love to Valentin and is shot. The scene then shifts to Molina in a heaven-like world, where all of the people in his life are watching his final "movie." The Spider Woman arrives and gives her deadly kiss as the curtain falls.

Songs

 Act I
 Prologue – Spider Woman and Prisoners
 "Her Name is Aurora" – Molina, Aurora, Aurora's Men and Prisoners
 "Over the Wall" – Prisoners
 "And the Moon Grows Dimmer" – Aurora
 "Bluebloods" – Molina
 "Dressing Them Up" / "I Draw the Line" – Molina and Valentin
 "Dear One" – Molina's Mother, Marta, Valentin and Molina
 "Over the Wall II" – Prisoners, Molina and Valentin
 "Where You Are" – Aurora, Aurora's Man and Prisoners
 "Over the Wall III" / "Marta" – Valentin and Prisoners
 "Come" – Spider Woman
 "I Do Miracles" – Aurora and Marta
 "Gabriel's Letter" / "My First Woman" – Gabriel and Valentin
 "Morphine Tango" – Orderlies
 "You Could Never Shame Me" – Molina's Mother
 "A Visit" – Spider Woman and Molina
 "She's a Woman" – Molina
 "Gimme Love" – Aurora, Molina and Aurora's Men

 Act II
 "Russian Movie" / "Good Times" – Aurora, Molina and Valentin
 "The Day After That" – Valentin and Families of the Disappeared
 "Mama, It's Me" – Molina
 "Anything for Him" – Spider Woman, Molina and Valentin
 "Kiss of the Spider Woman" – Spider Woman
 "Over the Wall IV" / "Lucky Molina" – Warden and Prisoners
 "Only in the Movies" / "His Name was Molina" – Molina and the People in His Life

Productions
Kiss of the Spider Woman was given a workshop by New Musicals, whose goal was to create, develop, and provide a working home for sixteen new musicals over four years, at the Performing Arts Center, State University of New York at Purchase in May 1990. It was directed by Harold Prince with choreography by Susan Stroman and featured John Rubinstein, Kevin Gray, Lauren Mitchell, and Harry Goz.  An attempt to persuade New York critics not to review this initial production (given its workshop status) failed, with Frank Rich in The New York Times, followed by other critics covering the production and filing mostly negative reviews.<ref>Suskin, Steven. Show Tunes" (Ed 3, revised, 2000). Oxford University Press US, p. 338-339</ref> New Musicals folded after Spider Woman.

Two years later, the producer Garth Drabinsky became involved, and his company, Livent, produced the show in Toronto at the St. Lawrence Centre for the Arts, Bluma Appel Theatre in June 1992. The cast starred Brent Carver as Molina, Anthony Crivello as Valentin and Chita Rivera as Spider Woman/Aurora.Atkey, Mel. Broadway North: The Dream of a Canadian Musical Theatre (2006). Natural Heritage/Natural History, Inc. . p. 220 Vincent Paterson choreographed the production assisted by Kim Blank. Keith McDaniel served as the production's dance captain and lead dancer who was featured as a dance partner to Chita Rivera in the original staging.Kiss of the Spider Woman premiered in the West End at the Shaftesbury Theatre on October 20, 1992, where it ran for 390 performances. Directed by Harold Prince with choreography by Vincent Paterson and co-choreography by Rob Marshall, it starred Brent Carver as Molina, Anthony Crivello as Valentin, and Chita Rivera as Spider Woman/Aurora. The production won the Evening Standard Award for Best Musical.

It opened on Broadway at the Broadhurst Theatre on May 3, 1993 and closed on July 1, 1995 after 904 performances. It was again directed by Harold Prince, with choreography by Vincent Paterson and Rob Marshall, scenic design and projection design by Jerome Sirlin, costume design by Florence Klotz, and lighting design by Howell Binkley. The cast included Carver, Crivello and Rivera repeating their roles, as well as Merle Louise and Kirsti Carnahan. Carver, Crivello and Rivera won Tony Awards for their performances. Notable replacements included: Brian Stokes Mitchell (Valentin), Howard McGillin and Jeff Hyslop (Molina); and, as Aurora María Conchita Alonso, Vanessa L. Williams (in her Broadway debut) and Carol Lawrence. The teaming of Williams, McGillin and Mitchell in June 1994 was so strong that many critics felt they were superior to the original cast (who had recorded the original cast album in London); in an unusual move producers recorded and released a second cast album featuring these principals.

The US regional theater premier took place at Masquerade Theatre in Houston, TX in May 1999. Directed and choreographed by Jim Williams, the show featured scenic and lighting design by Amy Ross and music direction by Brandon Matthews. The cast included Gina Nepoli-Holmes as Aurora, L. Jay Meyer as Molina, Pablo Bracho as Valentine, Monica Rial as Molina's Mother, Jacqui Williams as Marta, Tim Wroble as Gabriel, and Todd Porter as The Warden.

A 1996 touring version featured Chita Rivera again along with Juan Chioran as Molina and Dorian Harewood as Valentin.

It opened in Buenos Aires, Argentina at the Lola Membrives Theatre on May 2, 1995.

It opened in São Paulo, Brasil, in 2000, with Cláudia Raia and Miguel Falabella in the main roles.

Vortex Theatre Company revived it off Broadway in New York City in 2007.

A reduced production with a cast of 7 opened at The Darlinghust Theatre in Sydney, Australia on 13 July 2010.  Directed and choreographed by Stephen Colyer and music directed by Craig Renshaw, the cast included Alexis Fishman (Aurora/Marta), James Lee (Molina), Frank Hansen (Valentin), Jennifer White (Molina's Mother), Wayne McDaniel (The Warden), Jim Williams (Estabon/Gabriel), and Matt Young (Marcos/Aurelio).

Response
In his review of the Broadway production for The New York Times, Frank Rich wrote that the musical "does not meet all the high goals it borrows from Manuel Puig's novel. When it falls short, it pushes into pretentious overdrive (a "Morphine Tango", if you please) and turns the serious business of police-state torture into show-biz kitsch every bit as vacuous as the B-movie cliches parodied in its celluloid fantasies. Yet the production does succeed not only in giving Ms. Rivera a glittering spotlight but also in using the elaborate machinery of a big Broadway musical to tell the story of an uncloseted, unhomogenized, unexceptional gay man who arrives at his own heroic definition of masculinity."

Awards and nominations
Original London production

Original Broadway production

Popular culture references
In 2020, an amateur production of the musical is the focus of "Chapter Seven: Kiss of the Spider Woman" episode of Katy Keene. The Katy Keene cast album of the musical was produced via WaterTower Music.

References

 External links 
 
 Working in the Theatre: Kiss of the Spider Woman, panel discussion featuring the creators of the Broadway production
 Look Back at Kiss of the Spider Woman on Broadway (Playbill, May 3, 2019)
 Vanessa Williams' Broadway Debut in Kiss of the Spider Woman (Playbill'', March 18, 2020)
 The Guide to Musical Theatre - Plot summary, production photographs Kiss of the Spider Woman

1992 musicals
Broadway musicals
West End musicals
Musicals based on novels
LGBT-related musicals
Musicals by Kander and Ebb
Musicals by Terrence McNally
Tony Award for Best Musical
Tony Award-winning musicals